Peiro is a ghost town in Woodbury County, in the U.S. state of Iowa.

History
A post office was established at Peiro in 1877, and remained in operation until 1904. Peiro Bethel Cemetery marks the site.

References

Geography of Woodbury County, Iowa